Leon Trevor Hill (28 February 1936 – 22 January 2018) was a cricketer who played first-class cricket for South Australia and Queensland from 1958 to 1963.

A number-three batsman and off-spin bowler, Leon Hill began the 1959–60 Sheffield Shield season with a century for South Australia – 100 out of a second innings total of 200 – against Victoria. Later that season he scored 83 (the side’s top score) and 29 against Queensland. He lost form after that season and moved to Queensland, where he played two first-class matches, then to Victoria. 

He and his wife Val had a son and a daughter.

References

External links

1936 births
2018 deaths
South Australia cricketers
Australian cricketers
Cricketers from Adelaide
Queensland cricketers